The Fear (translit. O fovos) is a 1966 Greek crime film directed by Kostas Manoussakis. It was entered into the 16th Berlin International Film Festival and the 1966 Cannes Film Festival as the official Greek entry.

Cast
 Elli Fotiou as Chrysa Kavanari
 Anestis Vlahos as Anestis Kanalis
 Spiros Focás as Nikos
 Elena Nathanail as Anna Kanali
 Mary Chronopoulou as Mrs. Kanali
 Alexis Damianos as Dimitros Kanalis
 Kostas Gennatas
 Theodoros Katsadramis (as Thodoros Katsadramis)

References

External links

1966 films
1960s crime thriller films
1960s Greek-language films
Greek black-and-white films
Films directed by Kostas Manoussakis
Greek crime thriller films